Martín Rea Zuccotti (born 13 November 1997) is a Uruguayan footballer who plays as a centre-back for Querétaro.

Career statistics

Club

Notes

References

1997 births
Living people
Uruguayan footballers
Uruguayan expatriate footballers
Association football defenders
Uruguayan Primera División players
Ascenso MX players
Danubio F.C. players
Clube Atlético Mineiro players
Atlante F.C. footballers
Querétaro F.C. footballers
Expatriate footballers in Brazil
Uruguayan expatriate sportspeople in Brazil
Expatriate footballers in Mexico
Uruguayan expatriate sportspeople in Mexico
Footballers from Montevideo